The quaquaversal tiling is a nonperiodic tiling of the euclidean 3-space introduced by John Conway and Charles Radin. The basic solid tiles are half prisms arranged in a pattern that relies essentially on their previous construct, the pinwheel tiling. The rotations relating these tiles belong to the group
G(6,4) generated by two rotations of order 6 and 4 whose axes are perpendicular to each other. These rotations are dense in SO(3).

References 
.
.

External links
 A picture of a quaquaversal tiling
 Charles Radin page at the University of Texas

Discrete geometry
Tessellation